Zuppa Inglese (Italian for "English soup") is an Italian dessert layering custard and sponge cake, perhaps derived from trifle.

Description
To make Zuppa Inglese, either sponge cake or ladyfingers are dipped in Alchermes, a bright red, extremely aromatic Italian herb liqueur. They are then alternated with layers of crema pasticciera, a thick egg custard cooked with a large piece of lemon zest (removed afterwards). Often, a layer of crema al cioccolato is created by dissolving dark chocolate in a plain crema pasticciera. In Italy it is occasionally topped with cream, meringue or almonds.

Gelato
Zuppa Inglese is also a popular gelato flavor.

History
The origins of Zuppa Inglese are uncertain. One theory states that it originated in the sixteenth-century kitchens of the Dukes of Este, the rulers of Ferrara. According to this story, they asked their cooks to recreate the sumptuous "English trifle" they had enjoyed in England at the Elizabethan court, where they were frequent visitors. However, no recipes for the dish are recorded before the late nineteenth century, when it appears in cookbooks from Emilia-Romagna, Latium, Marches and Umbria.

Name
The word zuppa ("soup") in Italian cuisine refers to both sweet and savory dishes. It has a derivative in the verb inzuppare which means "to dunk"; as the sponge cake or ladyfingers are dipped in liqueur, the dish is called zuppa.  Similarly, thick bean with vegetable stews, and fish or shellfish stews are properly described as zuppa di verdure and zuppa di pesce, respectively.

There are other theories as to the origin of the name:

"The name translates literally in Italian as English soup and may in fact connote its similarity to English trifle.  Others believe it is a dialectical corruption of the verb inzuppare, meaning to sop."

"A dessert invented by Neapolitan pastrycooks of Europe during the 19th century. Inspired by English puddings that were fashionable [sic] at the time, . . . "

"This rich dessert was among the many tributes bestowed on Lord Nelson by the grateful Neapolitans after his victory over Napoleon in the Nile in 1798.  "English Soup", as it was called, was the creation of an anonymous pastry cook smitten with the admiral, the English, and their spirit-soaked Trifles."

See also
 Supangle

References

Italian desserts
Custard desserts
Cakes
Italian cuisine